Abubakr Rajeb al Abaidy also known as Abubakr Obeidi (born October 27, 1981) is a Libyan footballer. He plays for Nasr in the Libyan Premier League.

Al Abaidy has made several appearances for the Libya national football team, including participation in the 2012 Africa Cup of Nations finals.

References

External links

1981 births
Living people
Libyan footballers
Libya international footballers
Al-Ahli SC (Tripoli) players
Al-Nasr SC (Benghazi) players
Al-Hilal SC (Benghazi) players
2012 Africa Cup of Nations players

Association football midfielders
Libyan Premier League players